Send You is the first studio album by Sneaky Feelings. It was released in 1983 via Flying Nun Records.

Production
The album was recorded in four days, in a minimalist fashion.

Critical reception
AllMusic wrote that the album "makes a strong case that Sneaky Feelings were among the best pop bands of the '80s, no matter what part of the world they came from or what label released their records." PopMatters wrote that "the deft songwriting of Send You is not entirely showcased considering the label’s limited recording resources at the time, so most of the multi-tracked harmonies on display ... are unfortunately obscured." Perfect Sound Forever wrote that Send You "remains a gem, with songs like 'Throwing Stones' and 'Someone Else's Eyes' crystallizing the (often oversimplified) notion of a 'Dunedin Sound,' an identifiable jangle that hearkened back to the great guitar pop of the '60's."

Track listing

Personnel
Kat Tyrie - bass guitar, organ
Martin Durrant - drums, vocals, synthesizer
Matthew Bannister - guitar, vocals, organ
David Pine - guitar, vocals, vibraphone
Andrew Hubbard - percussion

References

1983 debut albums
Flying Nun Records albums
Sneaky Feelings albums